Robert Jay LaKind (November 3, 1945 – December 24, 1992) was an American conga player, vocalist, songwriter and occasional backup drummer with The Doobie Brothers. Originally a lighting roadie for the band, he was invited to join as a sideman for studio sessions after band members noticed his talent when LaKind goofed around on the congas after a concert.

LaKind was from Teaneck, New Jersey and graduated from Teaneck High School, Class of 1963. He attended the University of Kentucky and was a member of Sigma Nu fraternity, the Animal House of the university's fraternities during the 1960s. Also a member of Sigma Nu during this time was basketball player and future coach, Pat Riley.

LaKind was a session man with the Doobie Brothers from 1976 and joined them onstage as well. When the band appeared as guest stars on What's Happening!! in early 1978, he was portrayed as a full member. However, he was not actually credited as such on an album until the Farewell Tour album in 1983.

When the band reformed in 1988, he rejoined and was featured on the album Cycles, but he was soon forced into retirement by illness.

During the Doobie Brothers hiatus, and with some overlap, between approximately 1985 to 1991, he was also a member of local Santa Monica Afro-Cuban band, The Bonedaddys. He played congas and other percussion and recorded at least two albums with them: "A-Koo-De-A" (1988) and "Worldbeatniks" (1991).

LaKind's former bandmates performed two benefit concerts in 1992 to raise money for a trust fund set up for LaKind's two sons, Nicky and Cutter. He died from colon cancer on December 24 that year, at age 47.

References

1945 births
1992 deaths
American rock drummers
People from Teaneck, New Jersey
The Doobie Brothers members
University of Kentucky alumni
American rock percussionists
Deaths from colorectal cancer
Deaths from cancer in California
20th-century American singers
Conga players
20th-century American drummers
American male drummers
20th-century American male singers